An oligopoly (from Greek ὀλίγος, oligos "few" and πωλεῖν, polein "to sell") is a market structure in which a market or industry is dominated by a small number of large sellers or producers. Oligopolies often result from the desire to maximize profits, which can lead to collusion between companies. This reduces competition, increases prices for consumers, and lowers wages for employees.

Many industries have been cited as oligopolistic, including civil aviation, electricity providers, the telecommunications sector, Rail freight markets, food processing, funeral services, sugar refining, beer making, pulp and paper making, and automobile manufacturing.

Most countries have laws outlawing anti-competitive behavior. EU competition law prohibits anti-competitive practices such as price-fixing and manipulating market supply and trade among competitors. In the US, the United States Department of Justice Antitrust Division and the Federal Trade Commission are tasked with stopping collusion. However, corporations can evade legal consequences through tacit collusion, as collusion can only be proven through actual and direct communication between companies. 

It is possible for oligopolies to develop without collusion and in the presence of fierce competition among market participants. This is a situation similar to perfect competition, where oligopolists have their own market structure. In this situation, each company in the oligopoly has a large share in the industry and plays a pivotal, unique role. With post-socialist economies, oligopolies may be particularly pronounced. For example in Armenia, where business elites enjoy oligopoly, 19% of the whole economy is monopolized (BEEPS 2009 database), making it the most monopolized country in the region.

Types of oligopoly
Commodities in the oligopolistic market are divided into two categories: 

 Homogeneous commodities: In the oligopolistic market of a primary industry, such as agriculture or mining, the commodities produced by such oligopolistic enterprises will have strong homogeneity.
 Differentiated commodities: The differentiation of goods in the manufacturing and service industries will be very obvious. For example, different clothing companies may appeal to different demographics, and different mobile phone brands have different functions and appearances, etc.

With few sellers, each oligopolist is likely to be aware of the actions of their competition. According to game theory, the decisions of one firm influence and are influenced by the decisions of other firms. Strategic planning by oligopolists needs to take into account the likely responses of the other market participants. Entry barriers include high investment requirements, strong consumer loyalty for existing brands, and economies of scale. These barriers facilitate the formation and sustainability of collusion by stifling competition.

Oligopolistic companies can form when several companies expand into large business groups by appreciating and increasing capital to buy smaller companies in the same markets, which increases the profit margins of the business.The fundamental reason oligopolies form is related to future retaliation (deviation). In a market with low entry barriers, price collusion between established sellers makes new sellers vulnerable to undercutting. Recognizing this vulnerability, the established sellers will reach a tacit understanding to raise entry barriers to prevent new companies from entering the market. Even if this requires cutting prices, all companies benefit because they reduce the risk of loss created by new competition. In other words, firms will lose less for deviation and thus have more incentive to undercut collusion prices (obtain short-term deviated profit) when more join the market.The rate at which firms interact with one another is also expected to affect the incentives for undercutting other firms as the short-term rewards for undercutting competitors will be short lived where interaction is frequent and a degree of 'punishment' can expected swifty by other firms, but longer-lived where interaction is infrequent. Resultingly greater market transparency, in this case pertaining to the knowledge other firms have of prices and quantities of sales in rival firms, would decrease collusion. As oligopolistic companies would expect retaliation sooner where changes in their prices and quantity of sales are clear to their rivals.

In developed economies, oligopolies dominate, as the perfectly competitive model is of negligible importance for consumers. Specifically, oligopolists will price fix, a practice that lessens buyer choice and raises prices, to dominate these markets. Most new prosecuted oligopoly cases in the US in 2013 were based on price-fixing. 

As a quantitative description of oligopoly, the four-firm concentration ratio is often utilized and is the most preferable ratio for analyzing market concentration. This measure expresses, as a percentage, the market share of the four largest firms in any particular industry. For example, as of fourth quarter 2008, if we combine the total market share of Verizon Wireless, AT&T, Sprint, and T-Mobile, we see that these firms, together, control 97% of the U.S. cellular telephone market. These four cellular telephone firms have become the top-tier in US carriers and were protected by the US government that acted as an intervention for other firms entering the market.

Oligopolistic competition can give rise to a wide range of outcomes. In some situations, particular companies may employ restrictive trade practices (collusion, market sharing etc.) in order to inflate prices and restrict production in much the same way that a monopoly does. Whenever there is a formal agreement for such collusion between companies that usually compete with one another, this practice is known as a cartel. A prime example of such a cartel is OPEC, where oligopolistic countries manipulate the worldwide oil supply and ultimately leaves a profound influence on the international price of oil.

There are legal restrictions on such collusion in most countries and relevant regulations or enforcements against cartels (anti-competitive behaviours) enacted since the late of 1990s. For example, EU competition law has prohibited some unreasonable anti-competitive practises such as directly or indirectly fix selling prices, manipulate market supply or control trade among competitors etc., either by means of formal contracts or oral agreements. In the US, the Antitrust Division of the Justice Department and Federal Trade Commission was created to fight collusion among cartels. However, a formal agreement is not a requirement for collusion to take place, as tacit collusion can be achieved through mutual understanding among firms. For the collusion to be prosecuted as a crime there must be actual and direct communication between companies. For example, in some industries there may be an acknowledged market leader that informally sets prices to which other producers respond, (known as price leadership). Tacit collusion is becoming a more popular topic in the development of anti-trust law in most countries.

In other situations, competition between sellers in an oligopoly can be fierce, with relatively low prices and high production. Hypothetically, this could lead to an efficient outcome approaching perfect competition. The competition in an oligopoly can be greater when there are more competitors in an industry. Theoretically, it is harder to sustain cartels (anti-competitive behaviors) in an industry with a larger number of firms in that it will yield less collusive profit for each firm. Consequently, existing firms may have more incentive to deviate. However, this conclusion is a bit more intuitive and empirical evidence has shown this conclusion or relationship is a bit more ambiguous and mixed.

Thus the welfare analysis of oligopolies is sensitive to the parameter values used to define the market's structure. In particular, the level of dead weight loss is hard to measure. The study of product differentiation indicates that oligopolies might also create excessive levels of differentiation in order to stifle competition, as they could gain certain marker power by offering somewhat differentiated products.

Oligopoly theory makes heavy use of game theory to model the behavior of oligopolies:
 Stackelberg's duopoly. In this model, the firms move sequentially (see Stackelberg competition).
 Cournot's duopoly. In this model, the firms simultaneously choose quantities (see Cournot competition).
 Bertrand's oligopoly. In this model, the firms simultaneously choose prices (see Bertrand competition).
When compared with Cournot and Bertrand's model, it can be seen that price competition is more aggressive and competitive, and also it is easier to sustain collusion under price competition.

Characteristics 
Characteristics of oligopolies include:

 Profit maximization
 An oligopoly will maximize its profits.
 Price setting
 Oligopolies are price setters rather than prices takers.
 High barriers to entry and exit 
 The most important barriers are government licenses, economies of scale, patents, access to expensive and complex technology, and strategic actions by incumbent firms designed to discourage or destroy nascent firms. Additional sources of barriers to entry often result from government regulation favoring existing firms making it difficult for new firms to enter the market.
 Few firms 
 There are so few firms that the actions of one firm can influence the actions of the other firms.
 Abnormal long run profits
 Oligopolies retain abnormal long run profits. High barriers of entry prevent sideline firms from entering the market to capture excess profits.
 Product differentiation
 It can be homogeneous (steel) or differentiated (automobiles).
 Perfect knowledge
 Assumptions about perfect knowledge vary, but the knowledge of various economic factors can be generally described as selective. Oligopolies have perfect knowledge of their own cost and demand functions, but their inter-firm information may be incomplete. Buyers have only imperfect knowledge as to price, cost, and product quality.

Interdependence 
The distinctive feature of an oligopoly is interdependence. Oligopolies are typically composed of a few large firms. Each firm is so large that its actions affect market conditions. Therefore, the competing firms will be aware of a firm's market actions and will respond appropriately. This means that in contemplating a market action, a firm must take into consideration the possible reactions of all competing firms and the firms' countermoves. It is very much like a game of chess, in which a player must anticipate a whole sequence of moves and countermoves in order to determine how to achieve his or her objectives; this is known as game theory. For example, an oligopoly considering a price reduction may wish to estimate the likelihood that competing firms would also lower their prices for retaliation and possibly trigger a ruinous price war. Or if the firm is considering a price increase, it may want to know whether other firms will also increase prices or hold existing prices constant. This anticipation leads to price rigidity, as firms will only be willing to adjust their prices and quantity of output in accordance with a "price leader" in the market. An example for this interdependence among oligopolists such that Texaco needs to take into consideration whether its own price cut will trigger Shell's incentive to match, and so that the benefit or privilege gained by low price would be eliminated. This high degree of interdependence and need to be aware of what other firms are doing or might do stands in contrast with the lack of interdependence in other market structures. Simply put, every oligopolistic company that appears in companies with strong commodity homogeneity is reluctant to raise or lower prices. For example, if company A increases its price but B does not, A will lose all the market in an instant; if A decreases its price, B will inevitably decrease its price, which will lead to a price war for both parties and ultimately lose both sides. Therefore, raising or lowering the price does not do itself any good, and the best strategy is to keep the price the same. The price rigidity caused by the mutual game between oligopolistic enterprises is called interdependence. In a perfectly competitive (PC) market there is zero interdependence because no firm is large enough to affect market price. All firms in a PC market are price takers, as the current market selling price can be followed predictably to maximize short-term profits. In a monopoly, there are no competitors to be concerned about. In a monopolistically-competitive market, each firm's effects on market conditions are so negligible as to be safely ignored by competitors.

Non-price competition 
Generally speaking, the oligopolistic enterprise with the largest scale and the lowest cost will become the price setter in this market, and the price set by it will maximize its own interests and ensure that other small-scale enterprises also benefit. Oligopolies tend to compete on terms other than price. Loyalty schemes, advertisement, and product differentiation are all examples of non-price competition, which is perceived less risky and brings less disastrous impacts to business. In other words, oligopolists are able to extract more rents (charge prices above normal competition level without losing large consumers) by offering differentiated products or initiating promotion efforts. However, collusion among oligopolists is harder or more difficult to sustain along such non-price dimensions such as differentiation, marketing, product design.
For fighting collusion and cartels in an oligopoly market, competition authorities have taken measures or practices to effectively discover, prosecute and penalize them. Leniency program and economic analysis (screening) are currently two popular mechanisms.

Leniency program 
Competition authorities prominently have roles and responsibilities on prosecuting and penalizing existing cartels and desisting new ones. Thus, authorities have created an effective tool called the leniency program, which makes antitrust firms to be more proactive participants in confessing their collusion behaviors in that they will be granted immunity from fines and still have a right to plea bargaining if not receive a full reduction. Nowadays, leniency program has been implemented by several countries like US, Japan and Canada. However, it causes negative impacts to competition authorities themselves in the wake of abusing of leniency program that there are still many cartels in society and the expected sanctions for colluded firms will experience a sharp drop. As a result, the total effect of the leniency program is ambiguous and an optimal leniency program is required.

Economic analysis 
There are two screening methods that are currently available for competition authorities: structural and behavioral. In terms of structural screening, it refers to identify industry traits or characteristics, such as homogeneous goods, stable demand, less existing participants, which are prone to cartel formation. While regarding behavioral one, is mainly implemented when a cartel formation or agreement has reached and subsequently authorities start to look into firms' data and figure out whether their price variance is low or has a significant price increase or decrease.

Oligopolies in countries with competition laws 
Oligopolies become "mature" when competing entities realize they can maximize profits through joint efforts designed to maximize price control by minimizing the influence of competition. As a result of operating in countries with enforced antitrust laws, oligopolists will operate under tacit collusion, which is collusion through a mutual understanding among the competitors of a market without any direct communication or contact that by collectively raising prices, each participating competitor can achieve economic profits comparable to those achieved by a monopolist while avoiding the explicit breach of market regulations. Hence, the kinked demand curve for a joint profit-maximizing oligopoly industry can model the behaviors of oligopolists' pricing decisions other than that of the price leader (the price leader being the entity that all other entities follow in terms of pricing decisions). This is because if an entity unilaterally raises the prices of their good/service and competing entities do not follow, the entity that raised their price will lose a significant market as they face the elastic upper segment of the demand curve.

As the joint profit-maximizing efforts achieve greater economic profits for all participating entities, there is an incentive for an individual entity to "cheat" by expanding output to gain greater market share and profit. In the case of oligopolist cheating, when the incumbent entity discovers this breach in collusion, competitors in the market will retaliate by matching or dropping prices lower than the original drop. Hence, the market share originally gained by having dropped the price will be minimized or eliminated. This is why on the kinked demand curve model the lower segment of the demand curve is inelastic. As a result, in such markets price rigidity prevails.

Oligopoly in international trade

International trade has increased from $5 trillion USD in 1994 to $24 trillion USD in 2014. Following current trends, this number will only increase in the future as an increasing of firms are now competing internationally. Different from domestic oligopolies, international oligopolies have to consider importing and exporting tariffs as countries have different international policies. This is described as “strategic trade policy” and uses both the Bertrand and Cournot models as examples of interdependence. 

Game theory is used when theorizing international trade theory. The added features are “That oligopolistic firms would treat markets in each country as segmented rather than integrated and the second, that countries had a motive to raise domestic welfare by shifting rents from foreign firms to the domestic economy in the form of higher domestic profits, increased government revenue or above-normal wages.” (Head & Spencer, 2017).

Modeling 
There is no single model describing the operation of an oligopolistic market. The variety and complexity of the models exist because two to 10 firms can compete on the basis of price, quantity, technological innovations, marketing, and reputation. However, there are a series of simplified models that attempt to describe market behavior by considering certain circumstances. Some of the better-known models are the dominant firm model, the Cournot–Nash model, the Bertrand model and the kinked demand model.

As different industries have different characteristics, it is important to know which oligopoly model is more applicable for each industry. In reality, one main difference between industries is the capacity constraints.  As both Cournot model and Bertrand model consist of the two-stage game, the Cournot model is more suitable for firms in industry that face capacity constraints, where firms set their quantity of production first, then set their prices. The Bertrand model is more applicable for industries with low capacity constraints, such as banking and insurance.

Game theory 
“How to Nash equilibria in a game:
1.	checking for every outcome whether at least one player could benefit from deviating; if not, NE found!
2.	deriving best-response (or reaction) functions: Find best action of player for ALL feasible actions of rivals; NE at outcome where players actions are best responses to each other (i.e. where BR intersect)” (Gerlach, 2022).

“Examples: 
- best response to confess is confess, best response to not confess is also confess 
- unique Nash equilibrium is outcome (confess, confess)” (Gerlach, 2022).

“Multiple Nash equilibria and Pareto Dominance Criterion 
Definition: An Nash equilibrium Pareto dominates another equilibrium if at least one player would be better off in this equilibrium and no other player worse off. 
Example: Battle of the Sexes” (Gerlach, 2022).

 
“- for both players: best response to opera is opera, best response to football is football 
- Nash equilibria: (football, football), (opera, opera) 
- (opera, opera) Pareto dominates” (Gerlach, 2022).

Cournot–Nash model 

The Cournot–Nash model is the simplest oligopoly model. The model assumes that there are two "equally positioned firms"; the firms compete on the basis of quantity rather than price and each firm makes an "output of decision assuming that the other firm's behavior is fixed." The market demand curve is assumed to be linear and marginal costs are constant. To find the Nash equilibrium one determines how each firm reacts to a change in the output of the other firm. The path to equilibrium is a series of actions and reactions. The pattern continues until a point is reached where neither firm desires "to change what it is doing, given how it believes the other firm will react to any change." The equilibrium is the intersection of the two firm's reaction functions. The reaction function shows how one firm reacts to the quantity choice of the other firm. Firm  wants to know its maximizing quantity and price. Firm  begins the process by following the profit maximization rule of equating marginal revenue to marginal costs.

 [1.1]
 [1.2]

Equation 1.1 is the reaction function for firm . Equation 1.2 is the reaction function for firm .

To determine the Nash equilibrium you can solve the equations simultaneously. The equilibrium quantities can also be determined graphically. The equilibrium solution would be at the intersection of the two reaction functions. Note that if you graph the functions the axes represent quantities. The reaction functions are not necessarily symmetric. The firms may face differing cost functions in which case the reaction functions would not be identical nor would the equilibrium quantities.

Bertrand model 

The Bertrand model is essentially the Cournot–Nash model, except the strategic variable is price rather than quantity.

Bertrand's Model  can be used to explain  oligopoly. Bertrand's Model thinks competition as two firms compete in the market, such as firm one and your competitors(=the rest of the market as another firm). The model assumes that firms are selling homogeneous products and therefore have the same marginal production costs, and  firms will focus on competing in prices simultaneously. The idea is that after competing in prices for a while, they would eventually reach an equilibrium where the price both charge would be the same as their marginal cost of production. The mechanism behind this model is that even by undercutting just a small increment of its price, a firm would be able to capture the entire market share. The attempetion is very high and firms will have strong incentives to undercut their competitors in prices to grab the whole market profits. Even though empirical studies suggest that firms can easily make much higher profits by agreeing on charging a price that is higher than marginal costs, highly rational selfish firms would still not be able to stay at a price higher than marginal cost. It is worth noting that, Bertrand price competition is a useful abstraction of markets in many settings. Amongst many different prediction approaches, the Nash equilibrium approach has been recognised by some studies as an relatively efficient analytic tool. However, due to its lack of  ability to capture human behavioural patterns, the approach has been criticised for being inaccurate in predicting prices. 

The model assumptions are:
 There are two firms in the market
 They produce a homogeneous product
 They produce at a constant marginal cost
 Firms choose prices  and  simultaneously
 Firms outputs are perfect substitutes
 Sales are split evenly if 

Neither firm has any reason to change strategy. If the firm raises prices, it will lose all its customers. If the firm lowers price  then it will be losing money on every unit sold.

The Bertrand equilibrium is the same as the competitive result. Each firm will produce where  and there will be zero profits. A generalization of the Bertrand model is the Bertrand–Edgeworth model that allows for capacity constraints and a more general cost function.

Cournot-Bertrand model 

The Cournot model and Bertrand model are the most well-known models in oligopoly theory, and have been studied and reviewed by numerous economists.  The Cournot-Bertrand model is a hybrid of these two models and was first developed by Bylka and Komar in 1976.  This model allows the market to be split into two groups of firms. The first groups’ aim is to optimally adjust their output to maximise profits while the second groups’ aim is to optimally adjust their prices.  This model is not accepted by some economists who believe that firms in the same industry cannot compete with different strategic variables.  However, this model has been applied and observed in both real-world examples and theoretical contexts. 

In the Cournot model and Bertrand model, it is assumed that all the firms are competing with the same choice variable, either output or price.  However, this does not always apply in real world contexts. If each firm is able to choose their own strategic variable, there would be a total of four modes of competition.  The possibility of firms competing with different strategic variables is important to consider when assessing all potential market outcomes. Economists Kreps and Scheinkman's research demonstrates that varying economic environments are required in order for firms to compete in the same industry while using different strategic variables.  An example of the Cournot-Bertrand model in real life can be seen in the market of alcoholic beverages.  The production times of alcoholic beverages differ greatly creating different economic environments within the market.  The fermentation of distilled spirits takes a significant amount of time; therefore, output is set by producers, leaving the market conditions to determine price.  Whereas, the production of brandy requires minimal time to age, thus the price is set by the producers and the supply is determined by the quantity demanded at that price.

Oligopolistic market: Kinked demand curve model 

According to this model, each firm faces a demand curve kinked at the existing price. The conjectural assumptions of the model are; if the firm raises its price above the current existing price, competitors will not follow and the acting firm will lose market share and second, if a firm lowers prices below the existing price then their competitors will follow to retain their market share and the firm's output will increase only marginally. In other words, oligopolist's pricing logic is that competitors will match and respond to any price cut - retaliating to obtain more market share, while they will stick with the current or initial price for any price rising among competitors.

If the assumptions hold, then:
 The firm's marginal revenue curve is discontinuous (or rather, not differentiable), and has a gap at the kink
 For prices above the prevailing price the curve is relatively elastic
 For prices below the point the curve is relatively inelastic

The gap in the marginal revenue curve means that marginal costs can fluctuate without changing equilibrium price and quantity, thus, prices tend to be rigid.

Examples 
Many industries have been cited as oligopolistic, including civil aviation, agricultural pesticides, electricity, and platinum group metal mining. In most countries, the telecommunications sector is characterized by an oligopolistic market structure. Rail freight markets in the European Union have an oligopolistic structure. In the United States, industries that have identified as oligopolistic include food processing, funeral services, sugar refining, beer making, pulp and paper making, and automobile manufacturing.

Market power and market concentration can be estimated or quantified using several different tools and measurements, including the Lerner index, stochastic frontier analysis, and New Empirical Industrial Organization (NEIO) modeling, as well as the Herfindahl-Hirschman index.

Possible outcomes of oligopoly 
One possible outcome of oligopoly is the maintaining of a steady price as a result of a kinked demand curve. Firms in this situation concentrate their efforts on non-price competition. The kinked demand curve model suggests that prices would be relatively stable, and that firms will have little motivation to adjust their pricing in the near future. As a result, firms compete using strategies other than price competition. The firms participating in this market system are motivated by the desire to maximize their profits. Firms would earn a significant rise in market share if they reduced their prices. Although it is possible, it is doubtful that firms will accept this. As a result, other firms follow suit and reduce their prices as well. Because of this, demand will only grow by a marginal amount. As a result, demand for a price reduction is inelastic. It is likely that they will lose a significant portion of the market if they raise the price, since they would become uncompetitive when compared to other firms. As a result, demand is very elastic in response to price increases. Rather than assuming price rigidity, kinked demand strategies serve as a mechanism for enforcing compliance with a collusive price leadership strategy.

Another possible outcome of oligopoly is the price war. However, despite suggestions that pricing wars might be unproductive for the business, Schendel and Balestra  contend that at least some players in a price war can profit from their participation. Oligopolies can nevertheless have fierce pricing competition among their members, especially if they want to expand their market share. Oligopolies exist when firms compete with one another to reduce costs and gain market share. A common aspect of  oligopolies is the ability to engage in price competition selectively. When it comes to bread and special offers, supermarkets often fight on price, but when it comes to product such as yogurt, they charge a premium.

Demand curve 

In an oligopoly, firms operate under imperfect competition. With the fierce price competitiveness created by this sticky-upward demand curve, firms use non-price competition in order to accrue greater revenue and market share.

"Kinked" demand curves are similar to traditional demand curves, as they are downward-sloping. They are distinguished by a hypothesized convex bend with a discontinuity at the bend–"kink". Thus, the first derivative at that point is undefined and leads to a jump discontinuity in the marginal revenue curve.

Classical economic theory assumes that a profit-maximizing producer with some market power (either due to oligopoly or monopolistic competition) will set marginal costs equal to marginal revenue. This idea can be envisioned graphically by the intersection of an upward-sloping marginal cost curve and a downward-sloping marginal revenue curve (because the more one sells, the lower the price must be, so the less a producer earns per unit). In classical theory, any change in the marginal cost structure (how much it costs to make each additional unit) or the marginal revenue structure (how much people will pay for each additional unit) will be immediately reflected in a new price and/or quantity sold of the item. This result does not occur if a "kink" exists. Because of this jump discontinuity in the marginal revenue curve, marginal cost, s could change without necessarily changing the price or quantity.

The motivation behind this kink is the idea that in an oligopolistic or monopolistic competitive market, firms will not raise their prices because even a small price increase will lose many customers. This is because competitors will generally ignore price increases, with the hope of gaining a larger market share as a result of now having comparatively lower prices (price rigidity). However, even a large price decrease will gain only a few customers because such an action will begin a price war with other firms. The curve is, therefore, more price-elastic for price increases and less so for price decreases. Theory predicts that firms will enter the industry in the long run since market price for oligopolists is more stable or 'focal' in the long run under this kinked demand curve situation.

See also

 Big business
 Conjectural variation
 Market failure
 Monopoly
 Monopsony
 Oligopolistic reaction
 Oligopsony
 Perfect competition
 Planned obsolescence
 Prisoner's dilemma
 Simulations and games in economics education
 Swing producer
 Unfair competition

Notes

References

Further reading 

 Bayer, R. C. (2010). Intertemporal price discrimination and competition. Journal of economic behavior & organization, 73(2), 273–293.
Harrington, J. (2006). Corporate leniency programs and the role of the antitrust authority in detecting collusion. Competition Policy Research Center Discussion Paper, CPDP-18-E. 
Ivaldi, M., Jullien, B., Rey, P., Seabright, P., & Tirole, J. (2003). The economics of tacit collusion.

 
Market structure